Gladys Boot (1890 – 16 October 1964), was a British actress.

She studied acting privately with Elsie Fogerty, and made her stage debut in Newcastle in 1940 in Quiet Wedding; and in London at Wyndham's Theatre the following year in Quiet Weekend. In this, she appeared in over 1,000 performances, including overseas tours and for the forces, 1943-44. After the war, theatre work included as leading lady with the Liverpool Playhouse, and on tour and on Broadway in Yes M'Lord (1949); and again on tour as Mrs Higgins in Shaw's Pygmalion in 1951.

She died on 16 October 1964, in Chelsea, London.

Selected filmography
Harry Black (1958), as Mrs. Tanner 
Virgin Island (1958), as Mrs. Carruthers
Your Money or Your Wife (1960), as Mrs. Compton Chamberlain

References

External links

1890 births
1964 deaths
British stage actresses
British film actresses
British television actresses
People from Darlington
Actors from County Durham